Angels & Devils may refer to:
 Angels and Devils (TV series), a 1983 Hong Kong television drama serial produced by TVB
 Angels & Devils (Fuel album)
 Angels & Devils (Sarah Darling album), 2011
 Angels & Devils (The Bug album), 2014
 "Angels and Devils" (Numb3rs), an episode of the American television show Numb3rs
 Angels and Devils (game), on which Conway's Angel problem is based

See also
Angels & Demons (disambiguation)
Devils and Angels (disambiguation)